Korsakov or Korsakoff may refer to:

Korsakov (surname), a surname
Korsakov (town), a town in Sakhalin Oblast, Russia
Korsakov (air base), a former Soviet Naval Aviation airfield near Korsakov

See also
Korsakoff's syndrome, a brain disease caused by chronic alcoholism named after Sergei Korsakoff
Battle of Korsakov, a 1904 naval battle of the Russo-Japanese War